New Century Clubhouse, also known as Square House, is a historic clubhouse for a local women's club located in West Chester, Chester County, Pennsylvania. It was built in 1914, and is a two-story, "T"-shaped, stuccoed building with flanking one-story wings in the Colonial Revival style. It sits on a raised basement and has a hipped roof. The front entrance features a porch with Doric order columns. The five bay rear wing houses an auditorium, with stage and dressing rooms. As of January 2010, the building was being used by a Unitarian church.

It was listed on the National Register of Historic Places in 1983.

References

External links
Unitarian Congregation of West Chester website

West Chester, Pennsylvania
Clubhouses on the National Register of Historic Places in Pennsylvania
Colonial Revival architecture in Pennsylvania
Buildings and structures completed in 1914
Buildings and structures in Chester County, Pennsylvania
National Register of Historic Places in Chester County, Pennsylvania